Arviz (also Romanized as Ārvīz; also known as Ābrīz and Arbīz) is a village in Neh Rural District, in the Central District of Nehbandan County, South Khorasan Province, Iran. At the 2006 census, its population was 365, in 88 families.

References 

Populated places in Nehbandan County